Terry D. Scott is a former United States Navy sailor who served as the 10th Master Chief Petty Officer of the Navy, from April 22, 2002, to July 10, 2006.

Early life and education
Scott was born in Buffalo, Missouri. Before enlisting in the U.S. Navy, he lived in Louisburg, Kansas.

Career
Scott joined the U.S. Navy in December 1976, and began his active duty service in 1977. He completed the Missile Technician training, Basic Enlisted Submarine School, and the Navy's Instructor training school; he was later certified as a Master Training Specialist. He graduated with honors from the U.S. Navy Senior Enlisted Academy in 1990, and received a Bachelor of Science degree from Southern Illinois University. During his 29 years of service in the Navy, he was awarded the Legion of Merit, the Meritorious Service Medal, and multiple Navy Commendation and Navy Achievement Medals.

Personal life
Scott currently lives in Bellevue, Nebraska.

Duty Stations
Sea Duty:
USS John Adams (SSBN-620)
USS James Madison (SSBN-627) - Missile Division Leading Chief Petty Officer.
USS Jacksonville (SSN-699) - Chief of the Boat
Strike Fighter Squadron 192 - Command Master Chief

Shore Duty:
Fleet Ballistic Missile Submarine Training Center, Charleston, South Carolina - Qualified as Master Training Specialist
Holy Loch, Scotland, assigned to Commander, Submarine Squadron 14 embarked in USS Simon Lake (AS-33) - Squadron Missile Technician
Commander, Submarine Force, United States Atlantic Fleet (COMSUBLANT) - Senior Enlisted Nuclear Weapons Technical Inspector and Department Leading Chief Petty Officer
Naval Security Group Activity, Winter Harbor — Command Master Chief
Naval Forces, Central Command and Fifth Fleet — CNO-Directed Command Master Chief

Awards and decorations

 Enlisted Submarine Warfare Insignia
 Enlisted Aviation Warfare Specialist insignia
 Master Chief Petty Officer of the Navy Identification Badge

 Seven gold service stripes.

References

Living people
Master Chief Petty Officers of the United States Navy
Recipients of the Legion of Merit
Year of birth missing (living people)
People from Louisburg, Kansas
Recipients of the Navy Distinguished Service Medal
People from Buffalo, Missouri
People from Bellevue, Nebraska
Recipients of the Meritorious Service Medal (United States)